Preble Township may refer to the following townships in the United States:

 Preble Township, Adams County, Indiana
 Preble Township, Fillmore County, Minnesota

Township name disambiguation pages